Part of the AFI 100 Years… series, AFI's 100 Years…100 Passions is a list of the top 100 greatest love stories in American cinema. The list was unveiled by the American Film Institute on June 11, 2002, in a CBS television special hosted by  Candice Bergen.

Cary Grant and Katharine Hepburn are tied for the most films in the list, with six each. They co-starred in two of them - Bringing Up Baby and The Philadelphia Story. Audrey Hepburn and Humphrey Bogart each have five movies on the list. They co-starred in Sabrina.

The list

Criteria
 Feature-length fiction film: The film must be in narrative format, typically more than 60 minutes long.
 American film: The film must be in the English language with significant creative and/or financial production elements from the United States.
 Love story: Regardless of genre, a romantic bond between two or more characters, whose actions and/or intentions provide the heart of the film’s narrative.
 Legacy: Films whose "passion" have enriched America’s film and cultural heritage while continuing to inspire contemporary artists and audiences.

References

External links
 AFI's list

AFI 100 Years... series
Romance films
Centennial anniversaries